John Howlet (1810–1877) was an American tobacco manufacturer and politician who served one term in the Massachusetts House of Representatives.

Howlett was born on October 15, 1810, in Boston. His father, James Howlett, was the owner of a snuff mill in Saugus, Massachusetts. In 1838 he married Hannah Peters of Andover, Massachusetts. They had six children.

After his father died, Howlett bought out the other heirs to become the sole owner of the snuff mill. In 1863 he represented the 24th Essex District in the Massachusetts House of Representatives. He continued the tobacco business until the late 1860s, when he converted the property into a saw mill. In 1871 he sold the mill to Philip P. Hone. He died in 1877.

References

1810 births
1877 deaths
American tobacco industry executives
Members of the Massachusetts House of Representatives
People from Saugus, Massachusetts